Valentine Uwamariya (born 14 May 1971) is serving as the Minister of Education in Rwanda appointed by the President of Rwanda in February 2020.

Background and education 
Valentine Uwamariya was born on 14 May 1971 at Shangi Sector in Nyamasheke District. She got her secondary school certificate from Groupe Scolaire Sainte Famille, Nyamasheke. She furthered her education and earned a bachelor’s degree in Organic Chemistry from the National University in Rwanda. In 2005, Uwamariya bagged her master’s degree in Electrochemistry from the University of Witwatersrand in South Africa. Thereafter in 2007, she got a scholarship to study a PhD Programme at UNESCO-IHE and in 2013 she earned a doctorate degree.

Career 
Uwamariya served as the Deputy Vice Chancellor in charge of Training, Institutional Development and Research in the newly established Rwanda Polytechnic just before she came the Minister of Education.

References 

Living people
1971 births
Women government ministers of Rwanda
21st-century Rwandan politicians
Government ministers of Rwanda